Marian "Mady" Collier (née Marian Huxley; 1859–1887) also spelled as Marion Huxley, was a British 19th-century painter and is associated with the Pre-Raphaelite Brotherhood.

Biography 
Marian Huxley was born in 1859 in London, to father Thomas Henry Huxley and mother Henrietta Anne Heathorn. She had seven siblings, including her brother Leonard Huxley. She studied painting at the Slade School of Fine Art in London. Her work was shown at the Royal Academy of Arts and the Grosvenor Gallery.

On June 30, 1879, Huxley married the British writer and portrait painter, John Collier, also a Slade graduate. Together they had a daughter named Joyce, their only child in 1884. After the birth of Joyce, Huxley suffered from "nervous hysteria" (possibly postpartum depression) and in November 1887 she was taken to Paris for treatment with Jean-Martin Charcot, however, she contracted pneumonia and died in December 1887. She had erratic behavior and possibly mental illness, which appeared to increase in symptoms before she died.

After Marion died, John Collier married her younger sister Emma Huxley in 1889 in Norway.

Collier's work can be found in museum collections, including at the National Portrait Gallery in London, and the Science Museum in London.

References 

1859 births
1887 deaths
19th-century English painters
19th-century English women artists
Alumni of the Slade School of Fine Art
Artists from London
British portrait painters
English women painters
Marian
Marian
Pre-Raphaelite painters